In publishing and graphic design, Lorem ipsum is a placeholder text commonly used to demonstrate the visual form of a document or a typeface without relying on meaningful content. Lorem ipsum may be used as a placeholder before final copy is available. It is also used to temporarily replace text in a process called greeking, which allows designers to consider the form of a webpage or publication, without the meaning of the text influencing the design.

Versions of the Lorem ipsum text have been used in typesetting at least since the 1960s, when it was popularized by advertisements for Letraset transfer sheets. Lorem ipsum was introduced to the digital world in the mid-1980s, when Aldus employed it in graphic and word-processing templates for its desktop publishing program PageMaker. Other popular word processors, including Pages and Microsoft Word, have since adopted Lorem ipsum, as have many LaTeX packages, web content managers such as Joomla! and WordPress, and CSS libraries such as Semantic UI.

Example text
A common form of Lorem ipsum reads:

Source text
The Lorem ipsum text is derived from sections 1.10.32 and 1.10.33 of Cicero's .

The discovery of the text's origin is attributed to Richard McClintock, a Latin scholar at Hampden–Sydney College. McClintock connected Lorem ipsum to Cicero's writing sometime before 1982 while searching for instances of the Latin word , which was rarely used in classical literature. McClintock first published his discovery in a 1994 letter to the editor of Before & After magazine, contesting the editor's earlier claim that Lorem ipsum held no meaning.

The relevant section of Cicero as printed in the source is reproduced below with fragments used in Lorem ipsum highlighted. Letters in brackets were added to Lorem ipsum and were not present in the source text:

What follows is H. Rackham's translation, as printed in the 1914 Loeb edition, with words at least partially represented in Lorem ipsum highlighted:

See also

References

External links

 The original De finibus bonorum et malorum (Book 1) from Cicero, on Latin WikiSource

Filler text
Latin words and phrases
Nonsense
Cicero